Skamija is a student magazine for the Serbian Jovan Jovanovic Zmaj Grammar School.

History
The first issue was published in 1972. Skamija changed its name and look many times.

The Issues

"Silence" (2009)
With the "Silence" issue, Art directors and high-school students Milan Jovanović and Tara Petrić have redesigned the entire magazine, changed its format, switched the font to Minion Pro, and succeeded in making a prominent visual experience in spite of the very limited budget - the issue was in its entirety black and white. It is also the first black and white issue after a long series of coloured ones.

The idea was that the birds which used to live in Skamija, have left. Unfortunately they took all colour with them. They even took the sounds, thus encapsulating "Skamija" in silence - hence the name of the issue.

"Memoirs" (2010)
The next issue was named "Memoirs." The main topic is the celebration of 200 years since the foundation of Gymnasium Jovan Jovanović Zmaj. The magazine's deadline was January 27, but  graphic design had less than a couple of weeks to be designed.  So as to meet the tight deadline, the editorial staff and art director had to make severe cuts. 

Despite of these cuts to meet the deadline, the issue was delayed for a month by the printing house commissioned for the job. When it arrived on February 28, the paper copies were a disaster. The colours were washed out and seemed printed by a home office printer, and the edges of the pages were not equally cut.

The Memoirs Issue did not live up to its expectations, and did not outdo the previous issue. This has led to backlash between the editorial staff, the art director and faculty members.

External links
 More information about the Skamija magazine is available on the official web site of Gymnasium Jovan Jovanović Zmaj

1972 establishments in Yugoslavia
Eastern Bloc mass media
Education magazines
Magazines established in 1972
Mass media in Novi Sad
Magazines published in Serbia
Student magazines
Serbian-language magazines
Magazines published in Yugoslavia